Negative relative accommodation (NRA) was proposed by Joseph Kearney of Oxford University in 1967 as a measure of the maximum ability to relax accommodation while maintaining clear, single binocular vision. This measurement is typically obtained by an orthoptist, ophthalmologist or optometrist during an eye examination using a phoropter. After the patient's distance correction is established, the patient is instructed to view small letters on a card 40 cm from the eyes. The examiner adds lenses in +0.25 increments until the patient first reports that they become blurry.  The total value of the lenses added to reach this point is the NRA value. High NRA values (above +2.50) might be evidence to over minus, uncorrected hyperopia or latent hyperopia.

See also
Amplitude of accommodation
Convergence insufficiency
Positive relative accommodation

References 

Ophthalmology